The European sprat (Sprattus sprattus), also known as bristling, brisling, garvie, garvock, Russian sardine, russlet, skipper or whitebait, is a species of small marine fish in the herring family Clupeidae. Found in European waters, it has silver grey scales and white-grey flesh. Specific seas in which the species occurs include the Irish Sea, Black Sea, Baltic Sea and Sea of the Hebrides. The fish is the subject of fisheries, particularly in Scandinavia, and is made into fish meal, as well as being used for human consumption. When used for food it can be canned, salted, breaded, fried, boiled, grilled, baked, deep fried, marinated, broiled, and smoked.

Taxonomy
This fish was first described by Carl Linnaeus in 1758 in the 10th edition of Systema Naturae. He called it Clupea sprattus, but it was later transferred to the genus Sprattus. Three subspecies are recognised; S. sprattus balticus from the Baltic Sea; S. sprattus phalericus from the Mediterranean, Adriatic and Black Seas and S. sprattus sprattus from the eastern Atlantic.

Description
It is fairly elongate and somewhat laterally compressed, with a keel-like row of sharp scales along the belly. The lower jaw projects slightly, there are seldom any vomerine teeth on the roof of the mouth and the hind edge of the gill covers is smoothly rounded, without any fleshy protuberances. The dorsal fin has no spines and 13 to 21 soft rays while the anal fin has no spines and 12 to 23 soft rays. The origin of the pelvic fins, which have seven (occasionally eight) soft rays, are immediately below or in front of the origin of the dorsal fin. This fish has a bluish or greenish back and silvery flanks, with no dark spotting.

Distribution
The European sprat is native to the northeastern Atlantic Ocean. Its range includes the Baltic Sea, the North Sea, southern Norway and Sweden, round the coasts of the British Isles, the Iberian Peninsula, Morocco, the Mediterranean Sea, the Adriatic Sea and the Black Sea. It occurs both in open water well away from the coast and in bays and estuaries, being able to tolerate salinities as low as 4 parts per thousand. It is a schooling fish and migrates between its winter feeding grounds and its summer breeding grounds. It also makes vertical migrations, rising to near the surface at night to feed.

Ecology
Adult sprats feed on copepods such as Calanus, Pseudocalanus and Temora while juveniles feed on the eggs and larvae of these crustaceans, and on diatoms. Breeding takes place at any time of year but peaks between December and April in the Mediterranean and between April and August in the Baltic and northeastern Atlantic.

This fish is sometimes parasitised by a copepod, the sprat eye-maggot (Lernaeenicus sprattae) which burrows into its eye and causes loss of visual acuity or even blindness. Heavy infestations can kill the fish.

Uses

There are substantial fisheries for this fish in various parts of its range. It is mostly caught by trawling and is made into fish meal, canned, smoked, and eaten fresh; cooking methods include pan-frying and broiling. It is used for feeding mink and juveniles are used for fish bait. Young sprats are commonly known as brisling. Canned sprats (usually smoked) are available in many north European countries, including the Baltic states, Scandinavia, Ireland, Germany, Poland and Russia.  The fish has about 10.5% fat in its flesh and is a rich source of vitamins and minerals.

Status
This fish has large swings in its population size, particularly in the Mediterranean Sea and Black Sea. These may in part be due to the increasing dominance of the comb jelly Mnemiopsis leidyi which in turn may be related to increases in sea temperature. Landings by commercial fisheries in the Mediterranean and Black Seas fell in the 1990s but recovered in the next decade. The population size and trend of this fish is unknown and the International Union for Conservation of Nature is unable to assess its conservation status,  listing it as "Data deficient".

Nutrition information

References

European sprat
Fish of Europe
Fish of the Mediterranean Sea
Fish of the North Sea
Fish of the Black Sea
Fish of the Baltic Sea
Commercial fish
European sprat
European sprat